Nainpur Junction railway station is a railway station in Mandla District, Madhya Pradesh. Its code is NIR. It serves the town of Nainpur.

Nainpur was a railway hub on the narrow-gauge line. This was the junction point of Jabalpur 110 km to its north, Balaghat 76 km to its south, Mandla 50 km to its east and Chhindwara 150 km to its west. It is connected to Nagpur via Chhindwara and Gondia.

The station was Asia's largest narrow-gauge railway junction before the recent conversion to broad gauge. Presently, Nainpur-Chhindwara tracks are under broad-gauge conversion.
The Jabalpur–Nainpur-Gondia track has been fully converted to broad gauge. Currently some trains have started on this route.

References

Railway stations in Mandla district
Nagpur SEC railway division